British-American War may refer to:
 American Revolutionary War (1775-1783)
 War of 1812 (1812-1815)